Humaira Abid is a contemporary artist who was born in Pakistan. The main element she works with is wood. Her recent work combines traditional miniature painting with wood sculpture. Her work examines women's roles, relationships, and taboos from a cross-cultural perspective.

Background 
Humaira Abid is based in Seattle but was born in Pakistan. She moved to the Pacific Northwest in 2008. Much of her miniature paintings and wood work is based on her focus of refugee women, women in general, and their struggles. She grew up in an area in Pakistan where it was considered unspeakable to discuss periods, puberty, and the natural processes of women's bodies. It was her goal to set out and normalize these things so women don't feel ashamed of themselves and what they can't physically control.

Awards and exhibitions

Abid's work has been exhibited and published internationally. Her work has been reviewed by the Seattle Times, the Stranger, KUOW Public Radio, and the Seattle Weekly. She has appeared in the Stranger's Arts & Performances Quarterly magazine and the Huffington Post.

In 2012, Abid's installation "Breakdown in the Closet" was the winner of International Museum of Women's Community Choice Award for the MAMA: Motherhood Around the Globe exhibition. Clare Winterton, the museum's executive director, said "Humaira Abid's work is a reminder and challenge to all of us to create a world where the depth and complexity of all of our stories of women, and as mothers, can be seen, acknowledged and understood."

In 2014, she was awarded GAP funding by 4Culture and included in the "Knock on Wood" Biennial exhibition at Bellevue Arts Museum.

Abid was the subject of a short documentary, Heartwood: The Art of Humaira Abid (2014), produced and directed by Laila Kazmi. The short film aired on PBS on KCTS 9 television.

In 2017 Abid was awarded the Art Innovator Award Finalist by Artist Trust.

In 2020, Abid had a new exhibition at the Center For Art and Wood titled, "Searching for Home." The exhibition lasted through February 7, 2020 - October 3, 2020 and was curated by Jennifer-Navva Milliken.

Selected solo exhibitions
2017 Searching for Home, Bellevue Arts Museum, Bellevue, WA
2016 The Dressing Room, START Saatchi Gallery, London, UK
2015, Khaas Art Gallery, Islamabad, Pakistan
2013 Featured Artist at Aaina, Seattle Asian Arts Museum, Seattle, WA
2011 RED, ArtXchange Gallery, Seattle, WA
2010 Sculptures by Humaira Abid, Chawkandi Art Gallery, Karachi, Pakistan
2009–10 Lullaby, Rohtasll, Lahore, Pakistan; Khaas Art, Islamabad, Pakistan; Showcase Art Gallery, Dubai, United Arab Emirates
2007 Love Games, Sandra Phillips Art Gallery, Denver, CO
2006 Inner Concerto, Canvas Art Gallery, Karachi, Pakistan
2004 Directions, V.M. Art Gallery, Karachi, Pakistan
2004 Rose Relationships, Rohtas II, Lahore and Khaas Art Gallery, Islamabad, Pakistan
2003 Hidden Perspectives, Rohtas II, Lahore, Pakistan

Selected group exhibitions
2016 NW ART NOW, Tacoma Art Museum, WA
2016 WHY WOOD: Contemporary Practices in Timeless Material Wood, SOFAEXPO, Chicago, IL
2015 Exhibition by Khaas Art Gallery at ART15 London, UK
2015 Survey show of contemporary northwest artists, King street station, Seattle, WA
2015 FEAT 2015, Artist Trust Fellowship Exhibit, Galvanize, Seattle, WA
2015 Asian-Pacific American heritage month exhibition, Bellevue City Hall, WA
2014-15 Three person Show, ArtXchange Gallery, Seattle WA
2014-15 Knock on wood’ Biennial at Bellevue Arts Museum, WA,
2013-14 Installation ‘Garden of Fertility’, Seattle Municipal Tower, WA
2013 Women's Work: Culture and the Feminine, ArtXchange Gallery, Seattle, WA
2012 Celebrating Art: 30 Years of Rohtas, National Art Gallery, Islamabad, Pakistan
2012 Past and Present, Zahoor ul Akhlaque Gallery, National College of Arts, Pakistan
2010–12 in Family Unity – Unity of the World, a travelling group show in Russia and Europe
2010 Women and Art 2010, Sharjah Art Museum, Sharjah, United Arab Emirates
2009 Five Women Show, Rohtas ll, Lahore, Pakistan
2007 Group Exhibition, National Art Gallery, Islamabad, Pakistan
2007 Group Exhibition, Kuona Trust, Naivasha, Kenya
2005 Art For a Noble Cause Group Exhibition, Ejaz Art Gallery, Lahore, Pakistan
2005 Contemporary Chronicles in Miniature – Art from Pakistan and India, Art-Alive Gallery, New Delhi, India
2005 Group Exhibition, Sarawak Museum, Kuching, Malaysia
2004 Group Exhibition, Ejaz Art Gallery, Lahore, Pakistan
2004 Partage International Artists' Exhibition, MGI, Mauritius
2003 Scope X, NCA Faculty Exhibition, Zahoorul Akhlaque Gallery, Lahore, Pakistan
2003 Negotiating Borders : Contemporary Miniatures from Pakistan, Siddharta Art Gallery, Kathmandu, Nepal
2003 Group Exhibition, Canvas Gallery, Karachi, Pakistan
2002 Group Exhibition, Rohtas I, Islamabad, Pakistan
2002 Group Exhibition, Rohtas II, Lahore, Pakistan
2001 Group Exhibition, Gallery NCA, National College of Arts, Lahore, Pakistan
2001 Pun jab Artists' Association Exhibition, Lahore Arts Council, Lahore, Pakistan
2009 Bolivia Art Biennial, La Paz, Bolivia
2008 II International Wood Sculptors Symposium, Annaberg-Buchholz, Germany
2007 2nd International Women Artists Workshop, Kenya
2006 Artist in Residence, Europos Parkas, Museum of Central Europe, Lithuania
2005 Sculpture Symposium, Sarawak Museum, Kuching, Malaysia
2004 Artist in Residence, Garhi Artists' Studios, Lalitkala Academy, New Delhi, India
2004 Partage, International Artists Workshop, Flic en Flac, Mauritius

Works in permanent collections
Daetz Centre (Museum of Sculpture in Wood), Lichtenstein, Germany
National Art Gallery and Museum. Islamabad, Pakistan
Rangoon wala Trust, V.M Art Gallery, Karachi, Pakistan
Partage Contemporary Artists Association, Mauritius
Khas Art Gallery, Islamabad, Pakistan
Kuona Trust International, Nairobi, Kenya
Canvas Art Gallery, Karachi, Pakistan
Sarawak Living Museum, Sarawak, Malaysia

External links
ArtXchange Gallery 
The Seattle PI – Humira Abid at ArtXchange
The Daily Times (Pakistan) – Sculpting a lullaby Humaira Abid at Rohtas 2
International Examiner – “Women’s Work” show at the ArtXchange continues feminist dialogue

References

Living people
National College of Arts alumni
American contemporary artists
American women sculptors
Pakistani artists
Pakistani women artists
21st-century American women artists
Year of birth missing (living people)